The 1980 UC Davis Aggies football team represented the University of California, Davis as a member of the Far Western Conference (FWC) during the 1980 NCAA Division II football season. Led by 11th-year head coach Jim Sochor, UC Davis compiled an overall record of 7–2–1 with a mark of 5–0 in conference play, winning the FWC title for the tenth consecutive season. 1980 was the 11th consecutive winning season for the Aggies. With the 5–0 conference record, they stretched their conference winning streak to 38 games dating back to the 1973 season. The team outscored its opponents 267 to 178 for the season. The Aggies played home games at Toomey Field in Davis, California.

Schedule

References

UC Davis
UC Davis Aggies football seasons
Northern California Athletic Conference football champion seasons
UC Davis Aggies football